Star Wars: The Force Awakens is the novelization of the 2015 film of the same name. The author, Alan Dean Foster, also wrote Star Wars: From the Adventures of Luke Skywalker, the 1976 novelization of the first Star Wars film.

Development
Asked to write the novelization by Shelly Shapiro of Del Rey Books, Foster was given access to the screenplay of the film, along with stills from the film of characters and sets.

Foster wanted to develop a romance between Rey and Finn, which he thought was implied in the film. He later stated, "I expected to see that developed further in Episode VIII." He also expressed his dissatisfaction with the latter film, saying that it prompted him to write a treatment for Episode IX, "attempting in that storyline to explain a lot of the really silly things that happened in Episode VIII." However, he admitted that he "never expected Disney to do anything with [it]."

Differences between the novel and the film
The novelization includes additional scenes and dialogue. These include:
 A prologue featuring an excerpt from the "Journal of the Whills", a fictional journal first mentioned in Foster's first Star Wars novelization.
 Early in the novel, a sequence with Leia reveals the origin of main factions in the film: the Resistance, the New Republic and the First Order.
 A section revealing how Poe Dameron escapes from the crashed TIE fighter and leaves Jakku.
 A sequence where Rey and Chewbacca encounter Unkar Plutt on Takodana.

Publication history
To avoid spoilers caused by the book being released before the movie, the hardcover release was delayed until January 5, 2016. The e-book was released on December 18, 2015. The book was a #1 New York Times best seller.

Notes

References

External links

2016 American novels
2016 science fiction novels
Novels based on films
Novels by Alan Dean Foster
Books based on Star Wars
Del Rey books
Novel